Econcern was an international holding company, consisting of five operating companies: Ecofys, Evelop, Ecostream, Ecoventures and OneCarbon. These companies delivered solutions for renewable energy (solar energy, wind energy, bioenergy) and carbon credits, with a mission to "ensure a sustainable energy supply for everyone". Econcern employed 1,200 professionals in over 20 countries across the world.

Bankruptcy
In May 2009 Econcern filed for Dutch Chapter 11 for suspension of payments, the first step towards bankruptcy, after it failed to agree on refinancing terms on a €150 million corporate loan which matured on 1 April 2009. An administrator was appointed by a Dutch court to work with the board to try to identify new financing solutions. At stake were assets under development, such as the Belwind and Gode Wind I offshore wind farms, as well as operational assets, such as Q7. The company went bankrupt in Q3 2009.

References

External links
 Article on creation of Econcern new corporate visual identity, presented on Malta in September 2008

Defunct companies of the Netherlands